"Ein Heller und ein Batzen" is a German folk song. Written by  Albert von Schlippenbach in 1830 as a drinking song, it later became a popular marching song in the Wehrmacht during the Second World War.

Controversy 

"Ein Heller und ein Batzen", also known as "Heidi, heido, heida", was a popular marching song during WWII among the Wehrmacht troops invading Europe, which led to it entering popular recognition as a Nazi symbol. Even so, it is not recognized as such formally and therefore not outlawed per Article 86a of the German Criminal Code that prohibits the dissemination of signs of unconstitutional organizations.

Lyrics

Modern interpretations 

German schlager singer Heino included a version of this song on his 1968 album ...und Sehnsucht uns begleitet.

German heavy metal band Accept incorporated this song into "Fast as a Shark" in their 1982 album Restless and Wild.

References 

Volkslied
German military marches
1830s songs